This is a list of Ancient cities in Serbia.

References
Moesia

Serbia

Cities
 
Cities
Serbia